San Luis Obispo National Forest was established as the San Luis Obispo Forest Reserve by the U.S. Forest Service in California on June 25, 1906 with . It became a National Forest on March 4, 1907. On July 1, 1908 part of the forest was combined with Santa Barbara National Forest, the remainder was used to establish San Luis National Forest,  and the name was discontinued.

References

External links
Forest History Society
Listing of the National Forests of the United States and Their Dates (from the Forest History Society website) Text from Davis, Richard C., ed. Encyclopedia of American Forest and Conservation History. New York: Macmillan Publishing Company for the Forest History Society, 1983. Vol. II, pp. 743-788.

Los Padres National Forest
Former National Forests of California
Protected areas established in 1906
Protected areas disestablished in 1908
1906 establishments in California
1908 disestablishments in California